United Methodist Church in Estonia is a Methodist church organisation in Estonia. It is an independent church that belongs regionally to the Northern Europe Central Conference of the United Methodist Church and to the United Methodist Church Nordic and Baltic Episcopal Area. On the world level it is a member of the World Methodist Council.

Currently it has 26 congregations. It operates a theological seminary in Tallinn and a number of other ministries. Its official publication is the magazine Koduteel.

According to the 2011 census there were 1,098 Methodists in Estonia. According to the statistics from the Estonian Council of Churches, based on the numbers submitted by the member churches, there were 1,642 Methodists in 2012, served by 33 pastors and 1 deacon.

History

The first decades (1907–1940)

Methodist ministry in Estonia commenced in the first decade of the 20th century. In 1907, George A. Simons, an American of German descent, was named the superintendent of Finland and Russia with a seat in Saint Petersburg by bishop William Burt in Zürich. Estonia became part of Simmons' missionary area because it was part of the Russian Empire. The first missionary in Estonia was Vassili Täht, a colporteur of the British and Foreign Bible Society in Saint Petersburg. On 9 June 1907 Vassili met his friend Karl Kuum, a brother in the Moravian Church, on the island of Saaremaa. They started to proclaim the Gospel together. This date is considered the beginning of the activities of the Methodist Church in Estonia. The first Methodist service in Estonia was held in merchant Mihkel Trey's home in Kuressaare, Saaremaa. The congregation of Kuressaare, the first one in Estonia, was officially established on 26 August 1910 when three men and two women were accepted into communion. On 28 October 1912 the first Methodist church building in Estonia was consecrated in Kuressaare.

The evangelisation outside the town of Kuressaare was carried out by Martin Prikask. In July 1910 the first branch of the Kuressaare congregation was established in the village of Reeküla, the next one in September 1910 in the village of Rahniku. From the island of Saaremaa the Methodist mission spread to the mainland where the first congregation was established by Karl Kuum in July 1912 in Tapa. 

The wider spread of Methodism to various areas of Estonia began in 1918, approximately at the same time with Estonia gaining its independence. The first Methodist congregation in the capital, Tallinn, was established on 3 March 1922.  By 1 January 1940 the Methodist Church in Estonia constituted of 1,836 members in 14 congregations (Tallinn I and Tallinn II, Haapsalu, Tapa, Rakvere, Paide, Tartu, Viljandi, Pärnu, Narva, Avanduse, Kuressaare, Targu, and Paide). From 1920 to 1940 Methodists published a monthly magazine Kristlik Kaitsja and had their own publishing house of the same name. From 1935 to 1940 a second magazine, Koduteel, was published by congregations on the island of Saaremaa. Clergy was educated abroad, mostly in Germany. The church sent out its own missionaries among whom the most notable was Johannes Karlson, a missionary in South America.

As Methodism had spread in Estonia as part of the Russian mission of the Methodist Episcopal Church (MEC), the local congregations continued to be affiliated with this oldest and largest Methodist denomination in the United States. They remained for over a decade part of the Russian missionary district of the MEC. The first attempt to form a separate church district for Estonia took place in 1921 when the first annual Methodist conference in Estonia took place and Martin Prikask was appointed the first local superintendent, however, the position was abolished a year later. The district was restored in 1928 with Prikask becoming again superintendent. After the changes in the Estonian law of religion the local Methodist organisation was registered in 1935 as an independent church under the name of Methodist Episcopal Church in Estonia. The Methodist Church was given similar privileges to the Estonian Evangelical Lutheran Church and the Estonian Apostolic Orthodox Church. As according to the new law all churches had to be governed locally, superintendent Prikask was elected an acting bishop but was never consecrated as one, so the spiritual episcopal authority continued to be exercised by bishop Raymond J. Wade in Stockholm, Sweden.

Under occupations (1940–1991)

A few months before the Soviet occupation, on 25 February 1940 the General Meeting of the Methodist Episcopal Church in Estonia adopted new statutes and a new name, Estonian Methodist Church. In the first year of the Soviet occupation (1940–1941) several church members were repressed. Four Methodist pastors, including superintendent Martin Prikask, were arrested, deported and later executed. 

After a relative easing of restrictions on religious organisations during the German occupation (1941–1944) the religious life in Estonia became again subject to Soviet persecutions of religion. In the Stalinist era there were unsuccessful attempts to liquidate the Estonian Methodist Church and make the members to join the Estonian Evangelical Lutheran Church. Many congregations lost their buildings – in Tallinn one of the Methodist churches had been destroyed in a Soviet air raid in 1944 and the second church was taken over by the Soviet Army in 1950. The Methodist congregation in Tallinn had to move to a little church of the Seventh-day Adventists they continued to share until 2000. Some members of the Methodist clergy were further repressed, e.g. pastor of the Tallinn congregation Aleksander Kuum was arrested and deported in 1952.

Religious life in Estonia started to normalise after Joseph Stalin's death in 1953. In 1960s contacts with Methodist organisations abroad became possible again. In 1961 the first episcopal visit after WWII took place when Norwegian bishop Odd Arthur Hagen visited Tallinn. In 1968 when the United Methodist Church was founded, superintendent Aleksander Kuum from Estonia was able to take part in the founding conference in Dallas. Since that time the Methodist Church in Estonia has been part of the Northern Europe Central Conference of the United Methodist Church. In 1971 Aleksander Kuum became also a member of the World Methodist Council Executive Committee. From 1972 onwards the visits of Northern European bishops to Estonia became regular events, taking place once or twice a year.

After regaining independence (1991–)

Three years after Estonia regained freedom from the Soviet regime, the United Methodist Church founded the Baltic Methodist Theological Seminary for the purpose of training leaders for evangelism. The first class began with 54 students in August 1994. The seminary is now accredited as an institution of higher education in Estonia offering both one-year diploma certificate and a three-year degree programme in theology.

On 1 January 2007 the United Methodist Church in Estonia had 24 congregations and 4 ministry points with a total membership of 1,731.

Church government

Bishops

Since 1907 Estonian Methodists have operated under the spiritual rule of the following bishops:

1907–1912 William Burt 
1912–1924 John Louis Nuelsen
1924–1925 Anton Bast 
1925–1926 Ernest Gladstone Richardson
1926–1927 John Louis Nuelsen
1927–1928 Edgar Blake
1928–1946 Raymond J. Wade
1946–1953 August Theodor  Arvidson
1953–1970 Odd Arthur Hagen
1970–1989 Ole Edvard Borgen
1989–2001 Hans Växby
2001–2009 Øystein Olsen
2009– Christian Alsted

Superintendents
Since 1907 the Methodist Church in Estonia has been governed by the following superintendents:

1907–1921 George A. Simons
1921–1922 Martin Prikask
1922–1928 George A. Simons
1928 Otto Liebner
1928–1941 Martin Prikask
1941–1956 Martin Kuigre
1956–1962 Valdo Ojassoo
1962–1974 Aleksander Kuum
1974–1978 Hugo Oengo
1978–1979 Aleksander Kuum
1979–2005 Olav Pärnamets
2005–2018 Taavi Hollman
2018– Robert Tšerenkov

Congregations

The United Methodist Church in Estonia has altogether 26 congregations located in 10 different counties:

Harju County: Keila, Paldiski, Tallinn Estonian, Tallinn New Beginning, Tallinn Russian
Ida-Viru County: Jõhvi, Jõhvi Bethlehem, Kohtla-Järve Calvary, Narva, Sillamäe
Järva County: Paide
Lääne County: Haapsalu
Lääne-Viru County: Aseri, Kunda Bethany, Rakvere, Sakussaare, Tapa
Põlva County: Kärsa, Räpina
Pärnu County: Pärnu Agape
Saare County: Kuressaare, Reeküla
Tartu County: Tartu St Luke's
Võru County: Ruusmäe, Viitka, Võru Tree of Life

References

External links
 United Methodist Church in Estonia (in Estonian and Russian)

1907 establishments in Estonia
Christian organizations established in 1907
Protestantism in Estonia
Religious organizations based in Estonia
Methodist denominations
Members of the World Council of Churches